The following is a list of etchings by the Dutch painter and etcher Rembrandt, with the catalogue numbers of Adam Bartsch.
Each change or addition to the plate that can be seen in a print is referred to as a 'state' of the print.

See also
List of paintings by Rembrandt
List of drawings by Rembrandt

Sources
 The Complete Etchings of Rembrandt Reproduced in Original Size, Gary Schwartz (editor). New York: Dover, 1994.

 
Rembrandt Etchings